Clavus fulvus is a species of sea snail, a marine gastropod mollusk in the family Drilliidae.

Description
The size of an adult shell varies between 12 mm and 45 mm. The fulvous shell has six granulous, tubercularly ribbed whorls, that are angulated at the upper part. The suture shows a granulous line.

Distribution
This species occurs in the demersal zone of the tropical Indo-Pacific off Réunion, the Philippines and Indonesia.

References

 Hinds, R.B. (1843) On new species of Pleurotoma, Clavatula, and Mangelia. Proceedings of the Zoological Society of London, 1843, 36–46
 Tucker, J.K. 2004 Catalog of recent and fossil turrids (Mollusca: Gastropoda). Zootaxa 682:1–1295

External links
 

fulvus
Gastropods described in 1843